The 2022 Grand Prix Cycliste de Montréal was a road cycling one-day race that took place on 12 September 2022 in Montreal, Canada. It was the 11th edition of the Grand Prix Cycliste de Montréal and the 30th event of the 2022 UCI World Tour.

Teams 
All eighteen UCI WorldTeams, two UCI ProTeams, and the Canadian national team made up the twenty-one teams that participated in the race.

UCI WorldTeams

 
 
 
 
 
 
 
 
 
 
 
 
 
 
 
 
 
 

UCI ProTeams

 
 

National Teams

 Canada

Result

References

External links 
 

Grand Prix Cycliste de Montréal
Grand Prix Cycliste de Montréal
Grand Prix Cycliste de Montréal
2022